This is a list of festivals in Louisiana, grouped by theme. This is also a list of Louisiana's cultural events.

Festivals by type

Arts and crafts festivals
 Hot air balloon festival championship - Baton Rouge
 Red River Revel - Shreveport
 Shakespeare Festival - New Orleans
 Tennessee Williams/New Orleans Literary Festival - New Orleans

Film and media festivals
 Red Stick International Animation Festival - Baton Rouge

Food, harvest and wild game festivals
 La Fete Des Vieux Temps - Raceland
 Alligator Festival - Luling
 Andouille Festival - LaPlace
 Breaux Bridge Crawfish Festival - Breaux Bridge
 Catfish Festival - Des Allemands
 The Cochon de Lait - Mansura
 Oyster Festival - Amite
 International Rice Festival - Crowley
 Louisiana Fur and Wildlife Festival - Cameron
 Louisiana Peach Festival - Ruston
 Strawberry Festival - Pontchatoula
 Washington Parish Watermelon Festival - Franklinton
 Yambilee Festival - Opelousas
 Boudin Festival - Scott
 Sugar Cane Festival - New Iberia
 Frog Festival - Rayne
 Jambalaya Festival - Gonzales

Heritage and folk festivals
 *Festivals Acadiens - Lafayette
 Italian Festival - Tickfaw
 Louisiana Renaissance Festival - Hammond
 Contraband Days - Lake Charles

Holiday festivals
 Courir de Mardi Gras - Acadiana
 Holiday Trail of Lights - North Louisiana
 Natchitoches Christmas Festival - Natchitoches
 New Orleans Mardi Gras - New Orleans
 Festival of the Bonfires - Reserve, Garyville, Gramercy, and Lutcher Louisiana

Garden and botanical festivals
 Pollination Celebration - Tangipahoa Parish
 Herb and Garden Festival - Sunset
 Louisiana Forest Festival - Winnfield
 Daylily Festival - Abbeville

Music festivals

 Baton Rouge Blues Festival - Baton Rouge
 Bayou Country Superfest - New Orleans
 DeltaFest - Monroe
 Essence Music Festival - New Orleans
 Festival International - Lafayette
 French Quarter Festival - New Orleans
 Highland Jazz & Blues Festival - Shreveport, New Orleans
 New Orleans Burlesque Festival - New Orleans
 New Orleans Jazz & Heritage Festival - New Orleans
 Strawberry Jam'n Toast To The Arts Festival - Ponchatoula
 Voodoo Experience - New Orleans

Gallery

See also
 List of festivals in the United States
 Acadian World Congress - occasionally held in Louisiana

References

External links

 ARNB.ORG, Cajun and Zydeco music event schedules for the world
 Louisiana festivals calendar at nola.com
 Clarence's Louisiana festivals guide at cajunradio.org
 New Orleans and Louisiana festivals
 Lafayette's Own Boudin Cook-Off

Festivals
Louisiana